2013 Indonesia Super League All-Star Game (in Indonesian: ISL Perang Bintang 2013) is the annual football All-star game in Indonesia, which was held shortly after the end of 2013 Indonesia Super League. This is the closing event for the Indonesia Super League's 2013 season.

For this year football fans can't vote for the players to be included in the ISL All-Star team, now the player choice by a team of Technical Study Group (TSG). The other spot will be automatically taken by the 2013 Indonesia Super League champions, Persipura Jayapura. Obviously, the ISL All-star team will not be composed of any player from Persipura.

The 2013 season's MVP award and top-scorer award (both given to Boaz Solossa), best goalkeeper award (to Yoo Jae-Hun), coach of the year award (to Jacksen F. Tiago), rookie of the year award (to Syakir Sulaiman) and the ISL Champions' trophy (to Persipura Jayapura) were awarded by PSSI (Indonesia's FA) during a ceremony after the All-Star game.

Persipura win after defeat the All-Star team 2-0.

ISL All-Star Squad
The 2013 ISL All-Star squad was announced on September 13, 2013.

Staff
Head coach :  Benny Dollo (Persija Jakarta)
Assistant coach :  Joko Susilo (Arema FC)

Players

|-----
! colspan="11" bgcolor="#B0D3FB" align="left" |
|----- bgcolor="#DFEDFD"

|-----
! colspan="11" bgcolor="#B0D3FB" align="left" |
|----- bgcolor="#DFEDFD"

|-----
! colspan="11" bgcolor="#B0D3FB" align="left" |
|----- bgcolor="#DFEDFD"

ISL All-Star game

See also
 2013 Indonesia Super League

References

External links
Official Website

2013
All